Karujärv (Bear Lake) is a lake of Estonia. It is located in the western part of Saaremaa.

See also
List of lakes of Estonia

Lakes of Estonia
Saaremaa Parish
Landforms of Saare County